Stuart James (born 24 September 1978) is an Australian politician. He was elected as a Councillor to the City of Monash in October 2016 and was re-elected in 2020. On 11 November 2019 he was elected as the 17th Mayor of the City of Monash and was elected Mayor for the second time in November 2021. He is married with three daughters and a son.

Stuart is Chair of the Eastern Transport Coalition, a group consisting of Melbourne's seven eastern metropolitan local governments that advocate for sustainable and integrated transport services reducing car dependency. He sits on the Executive of the Metropolitan Transport Forum, a group of 26 Metropolitan Councils, as well as the Public Transport Users Association Committee.

References

External links

 Council Profile

1978 births
Living people
Victoria (Australia) local councillors
21st-century Australian politicians